The 9th Reserve Division (9. Reserve-Division) was a unit of the Imperial German Army, in World War I. The division was formed on the mobilization of the German Army in August 1914. The division was disbanded during the demobilization of the German Army after World War I. The division was a reserve division of the V Reserve Corps and was raised primarily in the Province of Posen and the Province of West Prussia.

Combat chronicle

The 9th Reserve Division began the war on the Western Front. It was part of the Fifth Army and pursued the Allies during the Great Retreat to the Woëvre region. It then participated in the Race to the Sea, seeing action in Flanders. It returned to the Woëvre region in December 1914, where it remained until early 1916. In 1916, it fought in the Battle of Verdun until June, and then went to the Champagne region to recover. It then saw action in the later phases of the Battle of the Somme. It remained in the Somme region and fought in the Battle of Arras in early 1917, the Battle of Passchendaele in Autumn 1917, and the tank battle at Cambrai in November 1917. In 1918, it saw action in the German spring offensive, including the Battle of Picardy. It remained in the line in the northern part of the Western Front until war's end. Allied intelligence noted that the division fought well in the battles of 1917, and rated the division as second class in 1918.

Order of battle on mobilization

The order of battle of the 9th Reserve Division on mobilization was as follows:

17.Reserve-Infanterie-Brigade
Reserve-Infanterie-Regiment Nr. 6
Reserve-Infanterie-Regiment Nr. 7
19.Reserve-Infanterie-Brigade
Reserve-Infanterie-Regiment Nr. 19
Reserve-Jäger-Bataillon Nr. 5
Reserve-Dragoner-Regiment Nr. 3
Reserve-Feldartillerie-Regiment Nr. 9
4.Kompanie/Niederschlesisches Pionier-Bataillon Nr. 5

Order of battle on March 28, 1918

The 9th Reserve Division was triangularized in March 1915 and reorganized again during the Battle of Verdun in April 1916. Over the course of the war, other changes took place, including the formation of the artillery and signals commands. The order of battle on February 25, 1918, was as follows:

18. Reserve-Infanterie-Brigade
Reserve-Infanterie-Regiment Nr. 6
Reserve-Infanterie-Regiment Nr. 19
Infanterie-Regiment Nr. 395
3.Eskadron/Reserve-Dragoner-Regiment Nr. 3
Artillerie-Kommandeur 97
Reserve-Feldartillerie-Regiment Nr. 9
Fußartillerie-Bataillon Nr. 29
Stab Pionier-Bataillon Nr. 309
4.Kompanie/Niederschlesisches Pionier-Bataillon Nr. 5
1. Reserve-Kompanie/Samländisches (Festungs-)Pionier-Bataillon Nr. 18
Minenwerfer-Kompanie Nr. 209
Divisions-Nachrichten-Kommandeur 409

References
 9. Reserve-Division (Chronik 1914/1918) - Der erste Weltkrieg
 Hermann Cron et al., Ruhmeshalle unserer alten Armee (Berlin, 1935)
 Hermann Cron, Geschichte des deutschen Heeres im Weltkriege 1914-1918 (Berlin, 1937)
 Günter Wegner, Stellenbesetzung der deutschen Heere 1815-1939. (Biblio Verlag, Osnabrück, 1993), Bd. 1
 Histories of Two Hundred and Fifty-One Divisions of the German Army which Participated in the War (1914-1918), compiled from records of Intelligence section of the General Staff, American Expeditionary Forces, at General Headquarters, Chaumont, France 1919 (1920)

Notes

Infantry divisions of Germany in World War I
Military units and formations established in 1914
Military units and formations disestablished in 1919
1914 establishments in Germany